Jason Bowld is a British drummer currently playing with the metal band Bullet for My Valentine, and formerly of Pitchshifter, This Is Menace and AxeWound. Bowld's first show with Bullet for My Valentine was at Wembley Arena in 2010, their original drummer Michael Thomas wasn't able to play. Jason said Matt Tuck rang him and gave him the setlist with no rehearsals, he had two days to learn the set. In 2021, Jim Davies of Pitchshifter, Jamie Mathias of Bullet For My Valentine, Tut Tut Child and Jason, formed Shadow Addict, an electro metal band.

They Fell from the Sky 
In 2008 Bowld formed They Fell from the Sky with Colin Doran of Hundred Reasons and recorded a series of demos before disbanding. The band regrouped in 2020 and released their first album 'Decade' in 2021.

Discography 
 Pitchshifter – Deviant (2000)
 Pitchshifter – PSI (2002)
 Blaze Bayley – Blood & Belief (2004)
 Hiding Place - At One Time Or Another (2004)
 This Is Menace – No End in Sight (2005)
 This Is Menace – The Scene Is Dead (2007)
 Pop Will Eat Itself – New Noise Designed by a Sadist (2011)
 Bill Bailey - Bill Bailey in Metal (2011)
 AxeWound – Vultures (2012)
 CJ WIldheart - Mable (2014)
 Pop Will Eat Itself – Anti-Nasty League (2015)
 Bullet for My Valentine – Live from Brixton: Chapter Two (2017)
 Bullet for My Valentine – Gravity (2018)
 CJ Wildheart - Siege (2020)
 Bullet for My Valentine – Bullet for My Valentine (2021)
 They Fell from the Sky – Decade (2021)
 CJ WIldheart - Lives - (2022)
 Hidora - The Devil Only Knows (2023)

Guest appearances 
 Jim Davies – Headwars (2020)

EPs 
 Shadow Addict – Vibrations (2021)

References

External links 
 

British rock drummers
British male drummers
Living people
21st-century British male musicians
Year of birth missing (living people)